David Tijanić (born 16 July 1997) is a Slovenian footballer who plays for Al-Adalah, on loan from Göztepe.

Club career
Tijanić made his Slovenian PrvaLiga debut for Olimpija Ljubljana on 5 March 2017 in a game against Rudar Velenje.

On 2 May 2021, Tijanić scored the winning goal in the Polish Cup final, helping Raków Częstochowa to their first ever major honour.

On 14 January 2023, Tijanić joined Saudi Arabian club Al-Adalah on loan.

International career
Tijanić made his national team debut on 7 October 2020 in a friendly against San Marino.

Honours
Raków Częstochowa
Polish Cup: 2020–21
Polish SuperCup: 2021

Notes

References

External links
 
 NZS profile 

1997 births
Living people
Slovenian footballers
Association football midfielders
Slovenia youth international footballers
Slovenia under-21 international footballers
Slovenia international footballers
NK Olimpija Ljubljana (2005) players
NK Krka players
NK Triglav Kranj players
Raków Częstochowa players
Göztepe S.K. footballers
Al-Adalah FC players
Slovenian Second League players
Slovenian PrvaLiga players
Ekstraklasa players
Süper Lig players
Saudi Professional League players
Slovenian expatriate footballers
Slovenian expatriate sportspeople in Poland
Expatriate footballers in Poland
Slovenian expatriate sportspeople in Turkey
Expatriate footballers in Turkey
Slovenian expatriate sportspeople in Saudi Arabia
Expatriate footballers in Saudi Arabia